Neoregelia burlemarxii is a species of flowering plant in the genus Neoregelia. This species is endemic to Brazil.

Cultivars
 Neoregelia 'Bob Work'
 Neoregelia 'Firelight'
 Neoregelia 'Grape Expectations'
 Neoregelia 'Margaux'
 Neoregelia 'Miniburl'
 Neoregelia 'Peggy Pollard'
 Neoregelia 'Pokahoo'
 Neoregelia 'Sapphire'
 Neoregelia 'Spring Rain'

References

BSI Cultivar Registry Retrieved 11 October 2009

burlemarxii
Flora of Brazil